Robert Lowry Brawner (born November 22, 1929) is an American former swimmer for Princeton University who held a world record in the 200-yard (short course) breaststroke and held four American records.

Biography
Brawner was a four-time All-American in swimming at Princeton University. He was the Eastern Intercollegiate League Champion for three years 1950-1952 in the 200 yd/220 yd breaststroke. Brawner was also the double NCAA champion in the 100 yd and 200 yd/220 yd breaststroke for 1950 and 1951.

In his first American record came in 1949 with the 200 yard breaststroke (20 yard) with a time of 2:16.7. His world record came in 1950 at the Eastern Intercollegiate Championships in the 200 yd breaststroke (short course) beating the former record holder Joe Verdeur in 2:14.2.

At the National AAU Indoor Championships in 1950, Brawner won the 220 yd breaststroke (short course) and set the American record in 2:29.3 beating the former record holder Joe Verdeur who was second in 2:29.4. This race was dual timed for both the 200 meter and 220 yard distances (short course). During the race, Verdeur broke the world record for 200 meters with a time of 2:28.3. Although this was the fastest 220 yard breaststroke (short course) in history, it stood only as the American record since FINA only recognized the 200 yard and 200 meter distances for world record purposes.

Brawner set another American record in the summer of 1950 in the 220 yd breaststroke (long course) at the National AAU Outdoor Championships when Brawner won in a time of 2:41 flat beating Bowen Stassforth who was second in 2:41.3. He was selected in 1950 as part of the American national swim team in several dual meets held in Japan. This was the first time the American swim team had defeated Japan on Japanese soil. At the second dual meet held in Osaka, Brawner won the 100 yd breaststroke and 200 yd breaststroke.

At the 1951 National AAU Outdoor Championships in the 100 m breaststroke (long course), Brawner was second to John Davies, but set the American record in the 100 m breaststroke (long course) in the preliminaries with a time of 1:08.3 At the 1952 US Olympic Trials, Brawner was seventh in the 200 m Breaststroke with a time of 2:44.9.

Record notes
The world record for the 200 meter breaststroke prior the bifurcation of the butterfly breaststroke into separate strokes in 1953 could be accomplished in either short or long course pools. FINA recognized only one world record for the 200 meter breaststroke. Brawner held the following records in his career:

200 yd breaststroke American Record (20 yard course), March 18, 1950-June 20, 1952
World record 200 yd breaststroke (short course), March 17, 1950-March 29, 1952
220 yd breaststroke American record progression (long course), July 22, 1950-August 27, 1952
220 yd breaststroke American record (short course), March 31, 1950-April 4, 1952

National competitions
Amateur Athletic Union Outdoor Championships
 220 yd breaststroke (1950)
 100 m breaststroke (1951)
 100 m breaststroke (1949)
 200 m breaststroke (1951)
AAU Indoor Championships
 220 yd breaststroke (1950)
 220 yd breaststroke (1951)
 100 yd breaststroke (1951)
 200 m breaststroke (1949)

NCAA Championships
 220 yd breaststroke (1951)
 100 yd breaststroke (1951)
 200 yd breaststroke (1950)
 100 yd breaststroke (1950)
 100 yd breaststroke (1952)
 200 yd breaststroke (1952)

Eastern Intercollegiate League Championships
 200 yd breaststroke (1952)
 100 yd breaststroke (1952)
 220 yd breaststroke (1951)
 200 yd breaststroke (1950)
 100 yd breaststroke (1950)

References 

1929 births
Possibly living people
American male breaststroke swimmers
Princeton Tigers men's swimmers
World record setters in swimming